Shanguy is French-Italian music collective project founded in 2017.

Discography

Singles

References 

French pop music groups
Italian pop music groups
French dance groups
Italian dance music groups
French dance music groups
French electronic music groups
Italian electronic music groups
French indie pop groups
Indie folk groups
French reggae musical groups
Italian reggae musical groups
French house music groups
Italian house musicians